Agrotis puta, the shuttle-shaped dart, is a moth of the family Noctuidae. The species was first described by Jacob Hübner in 1803. It is common in the western part of Europe, but is also found in southern and central Europe, as well as North Africa and the Middle East.

The wingspan is 30–32 mm. Adults are on wing from May to October.

The larvae feed on various low growing plants.

Subspecies
Agrotis puta puta
Agrotis puta insula (Isles of Scilly)

References

External links

Lepiforum e.V.

Agrotis
Moths described in 1803
Moths of Africa
Moths of Europe
Environment of the Isles of Scilly
Moths of the Middle East
Taxa named by Jacob Hübner